The Hotel Sevilla  is a historic hotel in Havana, Cuba.

History
The Hotel Sevilla opened on March 22, 1908. It was a four-story Moorish Revival structure, designed by architects Arellano y Mendoza on, located on Calle Trocadero, next to the Paseo del Prado, between the Malecón  and Parque Central. The Sevilla was bought by John McEntee Bowman and Charles Francis Flynn in 1919 and renamed the Hotel Sevilla-Biltmore. In 1924, Bowman-Biltmore Hotels constructed a huge ten-story tower wing, with a rooftop ballroom, designed by noted New York architects Schultze & Weaver.

In 1939, the Sevilla-Biltmore was purchased by Italian-Uruguayan mobster Amleto Battisti y Lora.  Its casino was closely associated with Havana's mafia network, being part-owned by Santo Trafficante, Jr. Mobs destroyed the Sevilla-Biltmore's casino on January 1, 1959, after Fulgencio Batista fled the country overnight as Fidel Castro's rebel army approached Havana. Amleto Battisti took refuge in the Uruguayan embassy.

The Sevilla-Biltmore was featured in Graham Greene's novel Our Man in Havana as the location where the protagonist joins the British secret service.

Today, the hotel is owned by the Cuban state-run Gran Caribe hotel group. The French Accor chain assumed management of it in 1996, first under their Sofitel division as the Hotel Sofitel Sevilla Havana, and more recently under their Mercure Hotels division as the Hotel Mercure Sevilla Havane. Accor announced plans in 2017 to renovate the Sevilla and transfer it to their boutique MGallery by Sofitel division. However, Accor ceased management of the hotel on December 31, 2018.

See also 

List of buildings in Havana

References

External links
 Hotel Sevilla fan website
 Hotel Sevilla cubaism.com

Bowman-Biltmore Hotels
Hotels in Havana
Hotels established in 1908
Hotel Sevilla
Hotel buildings completed in 1908
Nightclubs in Havana
20th-century architecture in Cuba